Hollandale may refer to a location in the United States:

Hollandale, Minnesota
Hollandale, Mississippi
Hollandale, Wisconsin